Okumura (written: 奥村) is a Japanese surname. Notable people with the surname include:

Chiyo Okumura (born 1947), popular Japanese Pop singer and former fashion model
Haruhiko Okumura, Japanese engineer
Okumura Hatsune (born 1990), Japanese singer-songwriter
Okumura Masanobu (1686–1764), Japanese print designer, book publisher, and painter
, Japanese graphic designer
Shigeo Okumura (born 1972), Japanese professional wrestler currently working in Mexico
Shohaku Okumura (born 1948), Japanese Soto Zen priest, founder of the Sanshin Zen Community in Bloomington, Indiana
Takeshi Okumura (born 1952), Japanese professional pool player
Tenzo Okumura (born 1944), Japanese politician of the Democratic Party of Japan, a member of the House of Representatives in the Diet
Togyu Okumura (1889–1990), famous Japanese modern painter of the nihonga style of watercolour painting
, Japanese ukiyo-e artist
Tsunao Okumura (1903–1972), the president of Nomura Securities between 1948 and 1959
Yoshihiro Okumura (born 1983), international swimmer, competing in the freestyle

Fictional characters 
Haru Okumura, a character in Persona 5
Kunikazu Okumura, also a character in Persona 5
Rin Okumura, main character in Blue Exorcist
Yukio Okumura, also a character in Blue Exorcist
Eiji Okumura, a main character in Banana Fish
Koushuu Okumura, a character in Ace of the Diamond
 Yumiko Okumura and Tomichi Okumura, characters in The Walking Dead

See also
Okumura Model, a Radio propagation model built using the data collected in the city of Tokyo, Japan

Japanese-language surnames